Goose Cove East is a town in the Canadian province of Newfoundland and Labrador. The town had a population of 172 in the Canada 2021 Census.

Demographics 

See also
 List of cities and towns in Newfoundland and Labrador

References

Towns in Newfoundland and Labrador